Oxana Savchenko (born October 10, 1990, in Petropavlovsk-Kamchatskiy) is a paralympic swimmer from Russia competing mainly in category S12 events, for visually impaired competitors.

References

External links
 

Paralympic swimmers of Russia
Swimmers at the 2008 Summer Paralympics
Paralympic gold medalists for Russia
Living people
Swimmers at the 2012 Summer Paralympics
Russian female medley swimmers
Russian female freestyle swimmers
1990 births
Medalists at the 2008 Summer Paralympics
Medalists at the 2012 Summer Paralympics
S12-classified Paralympic swimmers
Medalists at the World Para Swimming European Championships
Paralympic medalists in swimming
20th-century Russian women
21st-century Russian women